Nneka is an Igbo It can also be a shortened version of the Igbo name Nnemkadi. The following people have the name:
 Nneka (singer) or Nneka Egbuna, Nigerian-German singer and songwriter 
 Nneka Egbujiobi, Nigerian-American lawyer
 Nneka Abulokwe, British Nigerian tech and digital governance entrepreneur
 Nneka J. Adams, Canadian-based Nigerian actor, film writer, and movie producer
 Nneka Isaac Moses, Nigerian presenter, fashion designer, and the co-founder and managing director of the African cultural show, Goge Africa
 Nneka Ogwumike, American basketball player with the WNBA's Los Angeles Sparks
 Nneka Okpala, New Zealand athlete
 Nneka Onuorah, American director and producer
 Nneka Onyejekwe, Romanian volleyball player with Voléro Zürich 
 Nneka Ukuh, Nigerian track and field athlete  

Igbo given names